Austrebert or Austrebertus was bishop of Vienne in the Dauphiné, France, during the first half of the 8th century. He was in post by 719, as Pope Gregory II sent him a letter dated 31 August of that year, and was still in post on 7 March 742, when he received a letter from Pope Zachary. Austrebert was forced to flee Vienne shortly after this date by the raids of the Saracens and died "very far from Vienne".

He was preceded in the bishopric by Saint Bobolinus and succeeded by Saint Wilcharius.

He is locally venerated as a saint. His feast day is celebrated on 5 June.

References

Bishops of Vienne
7th-century births
740s deaths
Year of birth unknown
Year of death unknown
Gallo-Roman saints
8th-century Christian saints
Saints from the Carolingian Empire